Artemio is a given name. Notable people with the name include:

Artemio Franchi (1922–1983), Italian football administrator
Artemio Lomboy Rillera (1947–2011), the Roman Catholic bishop of San Fernando de La Union, Philippines
Artemio Panganiban (born 1936), the 21st Supreme Court Chief Justice of the Philippines
Artemio Reyes (born 1986), Mexican-American professional boxer in the Light Welterweight division
Artemio Ricarte (1866–1945), Filipino general during the Philippine Revolution and the Philippine–American War
Comrade Artemio, the alias of the man believed by many to be the current leader of the Shining Path, a Maoist guerrilla group in Peru

See also
Artemio Franchi Trophy, competition between the champions of the European Football Championship and the Copa América
BRP Artemio Ricarte (PS-37), one of the three Jacinto class of corvettes in the Philippine Navy
Stadio Artemio Franchi, football stadium in Florence, Italy
Stadio Artemio Franchi – Montepaschi Arena, multi-purpose stadium in Siena, Italy
The Death of Artemio Cruz (Spanish: La muerte de Artemio Cruz) is a novel written in 1962 by Mexican writer Carlos Fuentes